This is the cast of Out with Dad

Out with Dad